The Gardner–Webb Runnin' Bulldogs football program is the intercollegiate American football team for Gardner–Webb University in the U.S. state of North Carolina. The team competes in the NCAA Division I Football Championship Subdivision (FCS) and are members of the Big South Conference. Gardner–Webb's first football team was fielded in 1970. The team plays its home games at the 9,000-seat Ernest W. Spangler Stadium in Boiling Springs, North Carolina. The Runnin' Bulldogs are coached by Tre Lamb.

History

Classifications
1970–1992: NAIA Division I
1991–1999: NCAA Division II
2000–present: NCAA Division I–AA/FCS

Conference affiliations
 Independent (1946–1951)
 NAIA Independent (1952–1974)
 South Atlantic Conference (1975–1999)
 NCAA Division II Independent (1999–2001)
 Big South Conference (2002–present)

Conference championships

Playoff results

NAIA
The Runnin' Bulldogs appeared in the NAIA playoffs two times, with an overall record of 3–2.

Division I FCS
The Runnin' Bulldogs have appeared in the NCAA Division I FCS playoffs one time, with an overall record of 1–1.

Notable former players

Notable alumni include:
 Jim Garrison - American football head coach
 Bobby Hopkins - American football player and world champion arm-wrestler, Tampa Bay Bandits (1983)
 Gabe Wilkins - DT, Green Bay Packers (1994–1997), San Francisco 49ers (1998–1999) 

Cole Proctor (NFL Scout with Tennessee Titans and Arizona Cardinals)

Future non-conference opponents 
Future non-conference opponents announced as of January 19, 2023.

References

External links
 

 
American football teams established in 1970
1970 establishments in North Carolina